For the Love of Metal is the fourth solo studio album by Dee Snider, released in 2018 by the label Napalm Records. It was recorded by Nick Bellmore at Dexter's Lab Recording in Milford, Connecticut. It was produced by Jamey Jasta.

Background
For For the Love of Metal, there were many guest musicians involved in the songwriting. It features writing and additional performances by musicians like Howard Jones (Light the Torch, ex-Killswitch Engage), Mark Morton (Lamb of God), Alissa White-Gluz (Arch Enemy), Joel Grind and Nick Bellmore (Toxic Holocaust), Charlie Bellmore (Kingdom of Sorrow) and Tanya O'Callaghan.

In January 2018, Snider's mother died two months after being struck by a car, while the album was being recorded. He sings about her and dealing with mortality in the track "I'm Ready".

Dee Snider released music videos for the tracks "Tomorrow's No Concern" and "Become The Storm". A lyric video was released for the track "I am the Hurricane".

Reception

For the Love of Metal received generally good reviews upon its release. Despite including some "old-school tones" Dee Snider "carries his weight" in the modern era of metal, and has no trouble staying relevant. Snider uses this album to expand his career into other sub-genres of metal and "explore new grounds".

Track listing

Personnel
Primary Musicians 
 Dee Snider – Vocals
 Charlie Bellmore – Guitars, Bass
 Nicky Bellmore – Drums

Additional Musicians
 Tanya o'Callaghan - Bass ("Roll Over You" and "The Hardest Way")
 Joey Concepcion - Guest Guitar Solo ("I'm Ready")
 Howard Jones - Guest Vocals ("The Hardest Way")
 Alissa White-Gluz - Guest Vocals ("Dead Hearts (Love Thy Enemy)")

Charts

References 

Dee Snider albums
2018 albums
Napalm Records albums